Andrew Higgins, born 13 July 1981 in Epping, Essex, England, is a retired English rugby union player. He played as Centre or Wing for Worcester Warriors, Bristol, Bath, Exeter Chiefs, Sale Sharks and Newcastle Falcons.

Andrew was educated at Christ's Hospital school, Horsham, West Sussex.

Higgins, along with Alex Crockett and Michael Lipman resigned from Bath on 1 June 2009 prior to an internal disciplinary meeting at the club. Allegations of refusing to take drug tests - which the players deny - caused the RFU to investigate and they announced on 17 June that the 3 players and Justin Harrison would face an RFU disciplinary panel charged with "conduct prejudicial to the interests of the game".

Higgins played for newly promoted side, Exeter Chiefs, during the 2010/11 season. On 23 May 2012, Higgins left Exeter Chiefs to join with Newcastle Falcons. On 7 October 2013, Higgins is forced to retire from rugby due to his serious knee injury.

References

External links
Bath profile
Bristol profile
England profile
Exeter profile

1981 births
Living people
English rugby union players
Bath Rugby players
Worcester Warriors players
People educated at Christ's Hospital
People from Epping
Doping cases in rugby union
Exeter Chiefs players
Black British sportsmen
Rugby union players from Essex
Rugby union centres